Eikeland is a surname. Notable people with the surname include:

Amalie Eikeland (born 1995), Norwegian footballer
Else Berit Eikeland (born 1957), Norwegian diplomat
Karianne Eikeland (born 1972), Norwegian sailor
Ken-Levi Eikeland (born 1995), Norwegian racing cyclist
Olai Ingemar Eikeland (1915–2003), Norwegian politician
Olav Eikeland (born 1955), Norwegian philosopher and working life researcher 
Tor Helge Eikeland (born 1960), Norwegian ice hockey player